Prince Edward Island Route 8 is a 21.5 km (13.4 mi) secondary highway in central Prince Edward Island, Canada.

Route 8 begins at Route 1A south of Summerside, as Freetown Road. The road proceeds east to Route 2 in Summerfield, where Freetown Road ends. Route 8 is then signed concurrently with Route 2 for  before continuing east as Graham's Road. The road continues northeast to Route 6 in New London, where the Route 8 designation ends. Graham's Road then continues as Route 20.

References 

008
008
008